In a data warehouse, a measure is a property on which calculations (e.g., sum, count, average, minimum, maximum) can be made. A measure can either be categorical, algebraic or holistic.

Example
For example, if a retail store sold a specific product, the quantity and prices of each item sold could be added or averaged to find the total number of items sold or the total or average price of the goods sold.

Use of ISO representation terms
When entering data into a metadata registry such as ISO/IEC 11179, representation terms such as number, value and measure are typically used as measures.

See also
 Data warehouse
 Dimension (data warehouse)

References
 Kimball, Ralph et al. (1998); The Data Warehouse Lifecycle Toolkit, p17. Pub. Wiley. .
 Kimball, Ralph (1996); The Data Warehouse Toolkit, p100. Pub. Wiley. .
 Han, Jiawei Pei, Jian Tong, Hanghang. (2023). Data Mining Concepts and Techniques (4th Edition) - 3.2.4 Measures: Categorization and Computation. (pp. 105). Elsevier.

Data warehousing
Metadata